The year 1971 had three partial solar eclipses (February 25, July 22 and August 20) and two total lunar eclipses (February 10, and August 6).

The world population increased by 2.1% this year, the highest increase in history.

Events

January

 January 2 – 66 people are killed and over 200 injured during a crush in Glasgow, Scotland.
 January 5 – The first ever One Day International cricket match is played between Australia and England at the Melbourne Cricket Ground.
 January 8 – Tupamaros kidnap Geoffrey Jackson, British ambassador to Uruguay, in Montevideo, keeping him captive until September.
 January 9 – Uruguayan president Jorge Pacheco Areco demands emergency powers for 90 days due to kidnappings, and receives them the next day.
 January 12 – The landmark United States television sitcom All in the Family, starring Carroll O'Connor as Archie Bunker, debuts on CBS.
 January 14 – Seventy Brazilian political prisoners are released in Santiago, Chile; Giovanni Enrico Bucher is released January 16.
 January 15 – The Aswan High Dam officially opens in Egypt.
 January 18 
 Strikes in Poland demand the resignation of Interior Minister Kazimierz Świtała. He resigns January 23 and is replaced by Franciszek Szlachcic.
Ivan Koloff defeats Bruno Sammartino for the WWWF World Heavyweight Championship in wrestling ending a seven and two thirds years reign, the longest in the Championships history.
 January 19 – Representatives of 23 western oil companies begin negotiations with OPEC in Tehran to stabilize oil prices; February 14 they sign a treaty with 6 Khalij el-Arab countries.
 January 24 – The Guinean government sentences to death 92 Guineans who helped Portuguese troops in the failed landing attempts in November 1970; 72 are sentenced to hard labor for life; 58 of the sentenced are hanged the next day.
 January 25
 In Uganda, Idi Amin deposes Milton Obote in a coup, and becomes president.
 In Los Angeles, Charles Manson and 3 female "Family" members are found guilty of the 1969 Tate–LaBianca murders.
 Himachal Pradesh becomes the 18th Indian state.
 Intelsat IV (F2) is launched; it enters commercial service over the Atlantic Ocean March 26.
 January 31 – Apollo program: Apollo 14 (carrying astronauts Alan Shepard, Stuart Roosa, and Edgar Mitchell) lifts off on the third successful lunar landing mission.

February 

 February 4
 In Britain, Rolls-Royce goes bankrupt and is nationalised.
 The Nasdaq stock exchange is founded in New York City.
 February 5 – Apollo 14 lands on the Moon.
 February 6 – The 4.6 Mb Tuscania earthquake shakes the Italian province of Viterbo with a maximum Mercalli intensity of VIII (Severe), causing 24 deaths, 150 injuries and extreme damage.
 February 7
 Switzerland gives women voting rights in state elections, but not in all canton-specific ones.
 Władysław Gomułka is expelled from the Central Council of the Polish Communist Party.
 February 8 – A new stock market index called the Nasdaq Composite debuts in the United States.
 February 9
 The 6.5–6.7  Sylmar earthquake hits the Greater Los Angeles Area with a maximum Mercalli intensity of XI (Extreme), killing 64 and injuring 2,000.
 Satchel Paige becomes the first Negro league player to become voted into the Baseball Hall of Fame.
 Apollo program: Apollo 14 returns to Earth after the third human Moon landing.
 February 10 – A total lunar eclipse is visible from Pacific, Americas, Europe and Africa, and is the 50th lunar eclipse of Lunar Saros 123.
 February 11 – The US, UK, USSR and others sign the Seabed Treaty, outlawing nuclear weapons on the ocean floor.
 February 11 – 12 – Palestinian and Jordanian fighters clash in Amman.
 February 13 – Vietnam War: Backed by American air and artillery support, South Vietnamese troops invade Laos.
 February 15 – Decimal Day: The United Kingdom and Ireland both switch to decimal currency (see also decimalisation).
 February 16 – In Italy, a local parliament elects the city of Catanzaro as the capital of Calabria; residents of Reggio di Calabria riot for 5 days because of the decision.
 February 20 – The U.S. Emergency Broadcast System sends an erroneous warning across the nation's radio and television stations, meant to be a standard weekly test conducted by NORAD in Cheyenne Mountain in Colorado. Some stations cease broadcasting until the message is rescinded, as required by federal rules, while most ignore it.
 February 21 
 The Convention on Psychotropic Substances is signed at Vienna.
 Between February 21 and 22, an outbreak of nineteen tornadoes rage across the Mississippi Delta in Mississippi and Louisiana, killing 123 people.
 February 23 – Operation Lam Son 719: South Vietnamese General Do Cao Tri is killed in a helicopter crash en route to taking control of the faltering campaign.
 February 25 – A partial solar eclipse is visible from Europe, Africa and Asia, and is the 18th solar eclipse of Solar Saros 149.
 February 26 – Secretary General U Thant signs the United Nations proclamation of the March equinox (March 21) as Earth Day.
 February 27 – Doctors in the first Dutch abortion clinic (Mildredhuis in Arnhem) start to perform abortions.
 February 28 – Evel Knievel sets a world record and jumps 19 cars on a motorbike in Ontario, California.

March 

 March 1
 A bomb explodes in the men's room at the United States Capitol; the Weather Underground claims responsibility.
 Pakistani president Agha Muhammad Yahya Khan indefinitely postpones the pending National Assembly session, precipitating massive civil disobedience in East Pakistan.
 Canadian John Robarts ends his term of office as the 17th Premier of Ontario.
 March 2 – Awami League leader Sheikh Mujibur Rahman launched the non-cooperation movement in East Pakistan.
 March 4 – The southern part of Quebec, and especially Montreal, receives 16½" (42 cm) of snow in what becomes known as the Century's Snowstorm (la tempête du siècle).
 March 5
 The Pakistani army occupies East Pakistan. 
 In Belfast, a Led Zeppelin show includes the first public performance of "Stairway to Heaven," a song from the band's fourth album.
 March 6 – A fire in a mental hospital in Burghölzli, Switzerland kills 28 people.
 March 7
 Die Sendung mit der Maus airs its first episode on Das Erste.
 The British postal workers' strike, led by UPW General Secretary Tom Jackson, ends after 47 days.
 Sheikh Mujibur Rahman, political leader of East Pakistan (modern day-Bangladesh), delivers a public speech at the Racecourse Field in Dhaka calling for masses to be prepared to fight for national independence.
 March 8
 The Citizens' Commission to Investigate the FBI breaks into the Media, Pennsylvania offices of the Federal Bureau of Investigation and removes all of its files.
 "Fight of the Century": Boxer Joe Frazier defeats Muhammad Ali in a 15-round unanimous decision at Madison Square Garden.
 March 10 – William McMahon replaces John Gorton as the Liberal/Country Coalition Prime Minister of Australia after Gorton resigns following a vote of confidence that was tied 33-all.
 March 11 – THX 1138, George Lucas' first full-length film, premieres in theaters.
 March 12 – Hafez al-Assad becomes president of Syria.
 March 12–13 – The Allman Brothers Band plays their legendary concert at the Fillmore East.
 March 16 – Trygve Bratteli forms a government in Norway.
 March 18 – A landslide in Chungar, Peru crashes into Yanawayin Lake, killing 200.
 March 23 – General Alejandro Lanusse of Argentina takes power in a military coup.
 March 25 – 
 The Pakistani army starts Operation Searchlight in East Pakistan (now Bangladesh) at midnight after President Agha Muhammad Yahya Khan, a military ruler, voids election results that gave the Awami League an overwhelming majority in the parliament; start of the 1971 Bangladesh genocide. That ended the non-cooperation movement.
 The North East Mall opens in Hurst, Texas
 March 26
 East Pakistan's independence is declared by Ziaur Rahman on behalf of Sheikh Mujibur Rahman and transmitted using East Pakistan Rifles radio.
 Nihat Erim (a former CHP member) forms the new government of Turkey (33rd government, composed mostly of technocrats).
 March 27 – East Pakistan's independence is repeatedly declared by army major (later president of Bangladesh) Ziaur Rahman on behalf of Sheikh Mujibur Rahman from Kalurghat Radio Station, Chittagong.
 March 29
 U.S. Army lieutenant William Calley is found guilty of 22 murders during the My Lai Massacre and is sentenced to life in prison (he is later pardoned).
 A Los Angeles jury recommends the death penalty for Charles Manson and female followers Susan Atkins, Patricia Krenwinkel and Leslie Van Houten.
 March 30 – Starbucks coffee shop is founded in the U.S. state of Washington.

April 

 April 1 – The United Kingdom lifts all restrictions on gold ownership.
 April 5
 In Ceylon, a group calling themselves the People's Liberation Front begins a rebellion against the Bandaranaike government.
 Mount Etna erupts in Sicily.
 April 8 – A right-wing coup attempt is exposed in Laos.
 April 12 – Palestinians retreat from Amman to the north of Jordan.
 April 17
 The People's Republic of Bangladesh forms under Sheikh Mujibur Rahman at Mujibnagor.
 Libya, Syria and Egypt sign an agreement to form a confederation. 
 April 19
 The government of Bangladesh flees to India.
 Sierra Leone becomes a republic.
 The Soviet Union launches Salyut 1.
 Charles Manson is sentenced to death in the United States; in 1972, the sentence for all California death-row inmates will be commuted to life imprisonment.
 April 20
 Swann v. Charlotte-Mecklenburg Board of Education: The Supreme Court of the United States rules unanimously that busing of students may be ordered to achieve racial desegregation.
 Cambodian prime minister Lon Nol resigns but remains effectively in power until the next elections.
National Public Radio (NPR) airs its first broadcast.
 April 21 – Siaka Stevens is sworn in as the first president of Sierra Leone.
 April 24
 Soyuz 10 fails to dock with Salyut 1.
 An estimated 200,000 people in Washington, D.C. and a further 125,000 in San Francisco march in protest against the Vietnam War.
 April 25
 Todor Zhivkov is reelected as the leader of the Bulgarian Communist Party.
 Franz Jonas is reelected as president of Austria. 
 April 26 – The government of Turkey declares a state of siege in 11 provinces, including Ankara, in response to violent demonstrations.
 April 30
 The Milwaukee Bucks sweep the Baltimore Bullets in four games to win their first NBA championship.

May 

 May 1
 Amtrak begins intercity rail passenger service in the United States.
 The Ceylonese government promises amnesty for guerillas who surrender before May 5.
 May 2 – In Ceylon, left-wing guerillas launch a series of assaults against public buildings.
 May 3
 Arsenal F.C. wins the English League First Division championship at the home of their bitter rivals Tottenham Hotspur, with Ray Kennedy scoring the winner. (Arsenal will go on to win the league and cup 'double' six days later by defeating Liverpool in the FA Cup final).
 The Harris Poll finds that 60% of Americans are against the Vietnam War.
 East German leader Walter Ulbricht resigns as Socialist Unity Party leader but retains the position of head of state.
 1971 May Day Protests: Anti-war militants attempt to disrupt government business in Washington, D.C.; police and military units arrest as many as 12,000, most of whom are later released.
 May 5 – The U.S. dollar floods the European currency markets and especially threatens the Deutsche Mark; the central banks of Austria, Belgium, Netherlands and Switzerland stop the currency trading. 
FedEx, the logistics and delivery service, founded in Little Rock, Arkansas, United States.
 May 6 – The government of Ceylon begins a major offensive against the People's Liberation Front.
 May 9
 Arsenal FC beats Liverpool F.C. 2–1 to win the English FA Cup, thus completing the league and cup 'double'.
 Mariner 8 fails to launch.
 May 12 – An earthquake in Turkey destroys most of the city of Burdur.
 May 15 – Israeli ambassador to Turkey Efraim Elrom is kidnapped; he is found killed in Istanbul May 25.
 May 16 – A coup attempt is exposed and foiled in Egypt.
 May 18
 The U.S. Congress formally votes to end funding for the American Supersonic Transport program.
 The Montreal Canadiens win the Stanley Cup against the Chicago Black Hawks. The Canadiens became only the second team in NHL history to win the Cup in Game 7 on the road, and did so after the home team had won each of the previous six games in the series. This also marked Jean Béliveau's last NHL game.
 May 19 – Mars probe program: Mars 2 is launched by the Soviet Union.
 May 22 – An earthquake lasting 20 seconds destroys most of Bingöl, Turkey; more than 1,000 are killed and 10,000 are made homeless.
 May 23 – Aviogenex Flight 130 crashes at Rijeka Airport, Yugoslavia, killing 78 people, mostly British tourists.
 May 26
 Austria and the People's Republic of China establish diplomatic relations.
 Qantas agrees to pay $500,000 to bomb hoaxer/extortionist Mr. Brown (Peter Macari), who is later arrested.
 May 27
 Six armed passengers hijack a Romanian passenger plane and force it to fly to Vienna.
 Christie's auctions a diamond known as Deepdene; it is later found to be artificially colored.
 May 28 – Portugal resigns from UNESCO.
 May 30 – Mariner program: Mariner 9 is launched toward Mars.
 May 31 – The birth of Bangladesh is declared by the government in exile in territory formerly part of Pakistan.

June 

 June – Massachusetts passes its Chapter 766 laws enacting special education.
 June 1 – Vietnam War: Vietnam Veterans for a Just Peace, claiming to represent the majority of U.S. veterans who served in Southeast Asia, speak against war protests.
 June 6
 Soyuz program: Soyuz 11 (Vladislav Volkov, Georgi Dobrovolski, Viktor Patsayev) is launched.
 A midair collision between Hughes Airwest Flight 706 Douglas DC-9 jetliner and a U.S. Marine Corps McDonnell Douglas F-4 Phantom jet fighter near Duarte, California claims 50 lives.
 June 10
 The U.S. ends its trade embargo of China.
 Corpus Thursday: A student rally on the streets of Mexico City is roughly dispersed.
Amtrak had its first fatal accident when 11 people were killed and 163 injured in the derailment of the City of New Orleans train near Tonti, Illinois.
 June 11 – Neville Bonner becomes the first Indigenous Australian to sit in the Australian Parliament.
 June 13
 Vietnam War: The New York Times begins to publish the Pentagon Papers.
 Racing drivers Gijs van Lennep of the Netherlands and Helmut Marko of Austria win the 24 Hours of Le Mans in the Martini Racing Porsche 917K.
 June 14 – Norway begins oil production in the North Sea.
 June 17
 Representatives of Japan and the United States sign the Okinawa Reversion Agreement, whereby the U.S. will return control of Okinawa.
 President Richard Nixon declares the U.S. War on Drugs.
 June 18 – Southwest Airlines, a low-cost carrier, begins its first flights between Dallas, Houston and San Antonio.
 June 20 – Britain announces that Soviet space scientist Anatoli Fedoseyev has been granted asylum.
 June 21 – Britain begins new negotiations for EEC membership in Luxembourg.
 June 25 – Madagascar accuses the U.S. of conspiring to oust the government; the U.S. recalls its ambassador.
 June 27 – Concert promoter Bill Graham closes the legendary Fillmore East, which first opened on 2nd Avenue in New York City on March 8, 1968.
 June 28 – Assassin Jerome A. Johnson shoots Joe Colombo, boss of his eponymous crime family, in the head during an Italian-American rally, putting him in a coma.
 June 30
 After a successful mission aboard Salyut 1, the world's first human-occupied space station, the crew of the Soyuz 11 spacecraft die after their air supply leaks out through a faulty valve.
 New York Times Co. v. United States: The U.S. Supreme Court rules that the Pentagon Papers may be published, rejecting government injunctions as unconstitutional prior restraint.
 The musical fantasy film Willy Wonka & the Chocolate Factory, based on the novel Charlie & the Chocolate Factory and starring Gene Wilder and Jack Albertson, is released.

July 

 July – Nordic Council secretariat inaugurated.
 July 3 – Jim Morrison, lead singer of The Doors, dies of a heart failure due to a heroin overdose at the age of 27 in the bathtub of his apartment on the 3rd floor of the Rue Beautreillis 17 in Paris, France.
 July 4 
 Michael S. Hart posts the first e-book, a copy of the United States Declaration of Independence, on the University of Illinois at Urbana–Champaign's mainframe computer, the origin of Project Gutenberg.
 The first plane lands at Seychelles International Airport in Victoria, Seychelles (Mahe).
 July 5 – Right to vote: The 26th Amendment to the United States Constitution, formally certified by President Richard Nixon, lowers the voting age from 21 to 18.
 July 6 – Hastings Banda is proclaimed President for Life of Malawi.
 July 9 – The United Kingdom increases the number of its troops in Northern Ireland to 11,000.
 July 10–11 – Coup attempt in Morocco: 1,400 cadets take over the king's palace for three hours and kill 28 people; 158 rebels die when the king's troops storm the palace (ten high-ranking officers are later executed for involvement).
 July 10 – Gloria Steinem makes her Address to the Women of America.
 July 11 – Copper mines in Chile are nationalized.
 July 13
 Ólafur Jóhannesson forms a government in Iceland.
 Jordanian army troops launch an offensive against Palestinian guerillas in Jordan.
 The Yugoslavian government begins allowing foreign companies to take their profits from the country.
 Reggie Jackson's long home run, which hits a transformer on the roof of Tiger Stadium, helps the American League defeat the National League 6–4 in the Major League Baseball All-Star Game in Detroit.
 July 14 – Libya severs its diplomatic ties with Morocco.
 July 15 – American President Richard Nixon announces his 1972 visit to China.
 July 17 – Italy and Austria sign a treaty that ends the dispute (Südtirolfrage) regarding South Tyrol.
 July 18 – The Trucial States are formed in the Persian Gulf.
 July 19–23 – Major Hashem al-Atta ousts Jaafar Muhammad al-Nimeiri in a military coup in Sudan. Fighting continues until July 22, when pro-Nimeiri troops regain power. Al-Atta and three officers are executed.
 July 22
 A BOAC flight from London to Khartoum is ordered to land at Benghazi, Libya, where two leaders of the unsuccessful Sudanese coup, travelling as passengers, are forced to leave the plane and are subsequently executed.
 A partial solar eclipse is visible from Asia and North America, and is the 70th and final solar eclipse of Solar Saros 116.
 July 24 – Georgina Rizk of Lebanon is crowned Miss Universe 1971.
 July 25–30 – Arturo Benedetti Michelangeli records two Debussy works in Munich for Deutsche Grammophon, his fifth recording.
 July 26 – Apollo 15 (carrying astronauts David Scott, Alfred Worden and James Irwin) is launched.
 July 28 – Abdel Khaliq Mahjub, Sudanese communist leader, is hanged.
 July 29 – The United Kingdom opts out of the Space Race with the cancellation of its Black Arrow launch vehicle.
 July 30 – In Japan, an All Nippon Airways Boeing 727 collides with a Japanese fighter jet; 162 people are killed.
 July 31 – Apollo 15 astronauts David Scott and James Irwin become the first to ride in the Lunar Roving Vehicle, a day after landing on the Moon.

August 

 August – Camden, New Jersey erupts in race riots, with looting and arson, following the beating death of a Puerto Rican motorist by city police. Also in 1971, Philadelphia International Records is established, with Camden native Leon Huff as co-founder.
 August 1 – In New York City, 40,000 attend The Concert for Bangladesh.
 August 2 – J. C. Penney debuts its trademark Helvetica wordmark which has been used ever since.
 August 5 – The South Pacific Forum (SPF) is established.
 August 6 – A total lunar eclipse lasting 1 hour, 40 minutes, and 4 seconds is observed, visible from South America, Europe, Africa, Asia and Australia, and is the 38th lunar eclipse of Lunar Saros 128.
 August 7 – Apollo 15 returns to Earth.
 August 9
 India signs a 20-year treaty of friendship and cooperation with the Soviet Union.
 Internment in Northern Ireland: British security forces arrest hundreds of nationalists and detain them without trial in Long Kesh prison; 20 people die in the riots that follow.
 August 10 – Mr. Tickle, the first book in the Mr. Men series is first published.
 August 11 – Construction begins on the Louisiana Superdome in New Orleans.
 August 12 – Syria severs diplomatic relations with Jordan because of border clashes.
 August 14
 British troops are stationed on the Ireland border to stop arms smuggling.
 Bahrain declares independence as the State of Bahrain ( officially the Kingdom of Bahrain).
 August 15
 Jackie Stewart becomes Formula One World Drivers' Champion in the Tyrrell 003-Cosworth.
 The number of British troops in Northern Ireland is raised to 12,500.
 President Richard Nixon announces that the United States will no longer convert dollars to gold at a fixed value, effectively ending the Bretton Woods system. He also imposes a 90-day freeze on wages, prices and rents.
 August 16 – Hastings Banda, President of Malawi, becomes the first black president to visit South Africa.
 August 18
 Vietnam War: Australia and New Zealand decide to withdraw their troops from Vietnam.
 British troops are engaged in a firefight with the IRA in Derry, Northern Ireland.
 August 19–22 – A right-wing coup ignites a rebellion in Bolivia. Miners and students join troops to support president Juan José Torres, but eventually Hugo Banzer takes over.
 August 20
 International Telecommunications Satellite Organization (Intelsat) (effective February 12, 1973).
 The USS Manatee spills  of fuel oil on President Nixon's Western White House beach in San Clemente, California.
 A partial solar eclipse is visible from Southern Ocean, and is the 4th solar eclipse of Solar Saros 154.
 August 21 – A bomb made of two hand grenades by communist rebels explodes in the Liberal Party campaign party in Plaza Miranda in Quiapo, Manila the Philippines, injuring several anti-Marcos political candidates.
 August 25
 Border clashes occur between Tanzania and Uganda.
 Bangladesh and eastern Bengal are flooded; thousands flee the area.
 August 26 – A civilian government takes power in Greece.
 August 30 – The Progressive Conservatives under Peter Lougheed defeat the Social Credit government under Harry E. Strom in a general election, ending 36 years of uninterrupted power for Social Credit in Alberta.

September 

 September – Operation Sourisak Montry VIII opens when forces of the Royal Thai Army recapture several positions in the territory of Laos on the south bank of the Mekong in response to an encroaching Chinese presence to the north.
 September 2
 The United Arab Republic is renamed to the Arab Republic of Egypt
 September 3
 Qatar gains independence from the United Kingdom. Unlike most nearby emirates, Qatar declines to become part of either the United Arab Emirates or Saudi Arabia.
 Manlio Brosio resigns as NATO Secretary General.
 September 4 – A Boeing 727 (Alaska Airlines Flight 1866) crashes into the side of a mountain near Juneau, Alaska, killing all 111 people on board.
 The Free State of Christiania is founded.
 September 8 – In Washington, D.C., the John F. Kennedy Center for the Performing Arts is inaugurated, with the opening feature being the premiere of Leonard Bernstein's Mass.
 September 9 – English musician John Lennon releases his second studio album Imagine.
 September 9–13 – Attica Prison riot: A revolt breaks out at the maximum-security prison in Attica, New York. In the end, state police and the United States National Guard storm the facility; 42 are killed, 10 of them hostages.

 September 17 – Hugo L. Black retires as an Associate Justice of the Supreme Court of the United States after serving for 34 years, at this time a record for longevity; Black dies eight days later. 
 September 19 – Trams in Ballarat (Victoria, Australia) cease to run.
 September 21 – Pakistan declares a state of emergency.
 September 24 – Britain expels 90 KGB and GRU officials; 15 are not allowed to return.
 September 27–October 11 – Japanese Emperor Hirohito travels abroad.
 September 28 – Cardinal József Mindszenty, who has taken refuge in the U.S. Embassy in Budapest since 1956, is allowed to leave Hungary.
 September 29 – A cyclone in the Bay of Bengal, in the Indian state of Odisha, kills 10,000.

October 

 October 1 – Walt Disney World opens in Orlando, Florida. 
 October 4–7 – Pink Floyd record their groundbreaking film, Pink Floyd: Live at Pompeii at the Amphitheatre of Pompeii.
 October 13 – The Pittsburgh Pirates defeat the Baltimore Orioles 4–3 in Game 4 of the World Series at home in the first ever Major League Baseball postseason game played at night. The Pirates defeat the Orioles 2–1 in the decisive Game 7 at Baltimore four days later. 
 October 14 – Greenpeace is founded in Vancouver, British Columbia, Canada.
 October 14 – The 2500 year party of Iran starts, in the anicent city of Perspolis
 October 17 – The Pittsburgh Pirates defeat the Baltimore Orioles to win the 1971 World Series.
 October 18 – In New York City, the Knapp Commission begins public hearings on police corruption.
 October 21
 U.S. President Richard Nixon nominates Lewis Franklin Powell Jr. and William H. Rehnquist to the U.S. Supreme Court.
 The Clarkston explosion in Scotland, caused by a gas leak, kills 22 people.
 October 24 – Texas Stadium opens in Irving, Texas. In the inaugural game, the host Dallas Cowboys defeat the New England Patriots 44–21. 
 October 25 – The United Nations General Assembly admits the People's Republic of China and expels the Republic of China (or Taiwan).
 October 27 – The Democratic Republic of the Congo is renamed Zaire.
 October 28
 The House of Commons of the United Kingdom votes 356–244 in favour of joining the European Economic Community.
 The United Kingdom becomes the sixth nation successfully to launch a satellite into orbit using its own launch vehicle, the Prospero (X-3) experimental communications satellite, using a Black Arrow carrier rocket from Woomera, South Australia.
 The Khedivial Opera House in Cairo, Egypt, burns down.
 October 29 – Vietnam War – Vietnamization: The total number of American troops still in Vietnam drops to a record low of 196,700 (the lowest since January 1966).
 October 30 – Rev. Ian Paisley founds the Democratic Unionist Party in Northern Ireland.
 October 31
 A bomb explodes at the top of the Post Office Tower in London.                           
 Meddle, the critically acclaimed album by progressive rock band Pink Floyd, is released.

November 

Erin Pizzey establishes the world's first domestic violence shelter in Chiswick, London.
 November 3 – The UNIX Programmer's Manual is published.
 November 6 – Operation Grommet: The U.S. tests a thermonuclear warhead at Amchitka Island in Alaska, code-named Project Cannikin. At around 5 megatons, it is the largest ever U.S. underground detonation.
 November 8 – Led Zeppelin release their fourth studio album Led Zeppelin IV, which goes on to sell 23,000,000 copies in the United States.
 November 9 – A Royal Air Force C-130 crashes into the Ligurian Sea near Leghorn, Italy, killing all 51 people on board.
 November 10 – In Cambodia, Khmer Rouge forces attack Phnom Penh and its airport, killing 44, wounding at least 30 and damaging 9 airplanes.
 November 11 – The English rock band Pink Floyd releases its sixth studio album, Meddle.
 November 12 – Vietnam War – Vietnamization: U.S. President Richard M. Nixon sets February 1, 1972, as the deadline for the removal of another 45,000 American troops from Vietnam.
 November 13 – Mariner program: Mariner 9 becomes the first spacecraft to enter Mars orbit successfully.
 November 14 – Pope Shenouda III of Alexandria is enthroned.
 November 15
 Intel releases the world's first microprocessor, the Intel 4004.
 International Organization and System of Space Communications (Intersputnik) is founded (effective July 12, 1972).
 November 18 – Oman gains independence from the United Kingdom.
 November 20 – A bridge still under construction, called Elevado Engenheiro Freyssinet, falls over the Paulo de Frontin Avenue, in Rio de Janeiro, Brazil; 48 people are killed and several injured. Reconstructed, the bridge is a part of the Linha Vermelha elevate.
 November 22 – In Britain's worst mountaineering tragedy, the Cairngorm Plateau disaster, five children and one of their leaders are found dead from exposure in the Scottish mountains.
 November 23 – The People's Republic of China takes the Republic of China's seat on the United Nations Security Council (see China and the United Nations).
 November 24
 During a severe storm over Washington State, a man calling himself D. B. Cooper parachutes from the Northwest Orient Airlines plane he had hijacked, with US$200,000 in ransom money, and is never seen again (as of November 2022, this case remains the only unsolved skyjacking in history).
 A Brussels court sentences pretender Alexis Brimeyer to 18 months in jail for falsely using a noble title; Brimeyer has already fled to Greece.
 November 28 – The 59th Grey Cup Game sees the Calgary Stampeders beat the Toronto Argonauts 14–11.
 November 30 – Iranian forces occupy the Persian Gulf islands of Abu Musa (joint occupation by agreement with Sharjah) and the Greater and Lesser Tunbs (taken by force from Ras Al Khaimah).

December 

 December 1 – Cambodian Civil War: Khmer Rouge rebels intensify assaults on Cambodian government positions, forcing their retreat from Kompong Thmar and nearby Ba Ray, 10 kilometers northeast of Phnom Penh.
 December 2
Six of the seven Trucial States combine in an act of union to found the United Arab Emirates.
The Soviet Mars 3 lander reaches the surface of Mars, transmits for a few seconds and then goes silent. It is the first spacecraft to reach the planet.
 December 3 – The Indo-Pakistani War of 1971 begins with Operation Chengiz Khan as Pakistan launches preemptive attacks on nine Indian airbases. The next day India launches a massive invasion of East Pakistan.
 December 3–4 – The Pakistani submarine PNS Ghazi (former ) sinks mysteriously near the Indian coast while laying mines.
 December 4
 The Montreux Casino burns down during a Frank Zappa concert (the event is memorialized in the Deep Purple song "Smoke on the Water"). The casino is rebuilt in 1975.
 The McGurk's Bar bombing by the Ulster Volunteer Force in Belfast kills 15.
December 7 – Battle of Sylhet rages between the Pakistani military and the Mukti Bahini.
 December 8 – U.S. President Richard Nixon orders the 7th Fleet to move towards the Bay of Bengal in the Indian Ocean.
 December 10 – The John Sinclair Freedom Rally in support of the imprisoned activist features a performance by John Lennon at Crisler Arena, Ann Arbor, Michigan.
 December 11 – Nihat Erim forms the new government of Turkey (34th government; Nihat Erim has served two times as prime minister).
 December 16 – Victory Day of Bangladesh: The Pakistan Army in East Pakistan (now Bangladesh) surrenders to the joint forces of India and the Bengali nationalist separatists, ending the Bangladesh Liberation War.
 December 18
 The U.S. dollar is devalued for the second time in history.
 The world's largest hydroelectric plant in Krasnoyarsk, Soviet Union, begins operations.
 December 19
 Clube Atlético Mineiro wins the Brazil Football Championship.
 Intelsat IV (F3) is launched; it enters commercial service over the Atlantic Ocean February 18, 1972.
 The controversial dystopian crime film A Clockwork Orange, directed by Stanley Kubrick is released in New York City.
 December 20 – Two groups of French doctors involved in humanitarian aid merge to form Médecins Sans Frontières.
 December 24
 Giovanni Leone is elected President of the Italian Republic.
 Juliane Koepcke survives a fall of 10,000 feet following disintegration of LANSA Flight 508.
 December 25
 In the longest American football game in National Football League history, the Miami Dolphins beat the Kansas City Chiefs 27-24 after 82 minutes, 40 seconds of playing time. Garo Yepremian kicked the winning 37-yard field goal after 7:40 of the second overtime period. 
 Daeyeonggak Hotel fire: A fire at a 22-story hotel in Seoul, South Korea, kills 158 people.
December 26
Former teacher Patrick Critton hijacks Air Canada Flight 932, diverting the flight from Canada to Cuba. He would remain a fugitive for almost 30 years.
 The first reported sighting of the Nullarbor Nymph in Australia was made. The story traveled around the world until it was proven to be a hoax in 1972.
 December 29 – The United Kingdom gives up its military bases in Malta.
 December 30 – The first McDonald's in Australia opens in Yagoona, Sydney.

Date unknown 
 Ray Tomlinson sends the first ARPANET e-mail between host computers, in late 1971 
 The Center for Science in the Public Interest is established in the United States.
 Bulanti motorcar built in Australia.

Births

January 

 January 1 – Sammie Henson, American wrestler, Olympic silver medalist
 January 2
 Taye Diggs, American actor
 Renée Elise Goldsberry, American actress, singer and songwriter
 January 3 – Shireen Abu Akleh, Palestinian/American journalist (d. 2022)
 January 7
 DJ Ötzi, Austrian entertainer and singer
 Jeremy Renner, American actor, singer and producer
 January 11 – Mary J. Blige, American singer
 January 12
 Arman Alizad, Iranian-born Finnish tailor and television presenter
 Peter Madsen, Danish entrepreneur, engineer, and convicted murderer
 January 14 – Lasse Kjus, Norwegian alpine skier
 January 15 – Regina King, American actress
 January 16 – Sergi Bruguera, Spanish tennis player
 January 17 – Kid Rock, American rock singer
 January 18
 Pep Guardiola, Spanish football player and manager of Manchester City F.C.
 Binyavanga Wainaina, Kenyan writer (d. 2019)
 January 19 – Shawn Wayans, American actor
 January 20 – Gary Barlow, British singer-songwriter
 January 23 – Julie Foudy, American soccer player and commentator
 January 27 – Fann Wong, Singporean actress and singer
 January 31 – Patricia Velásquez, Venezuelan actress and model

February

 February 1
 Michael C. Hall, American actor
 Adriana Lessa, Brazilian actress
 Zlatko Zahovič, Slovenian footballer
 February 3 – Sarah Kane, English playwright (d. 1999)
 February 4 
 Fatmir Limaj, Albanian politician
 Rob Corddry, American actor and comedian
 February 5 – Sara Evans, American country music singer 
 February 8 – Andrus Veerpalu, Estonian cross-country skier
 February 10
 Lorena Rojas, Mexican actress (d. 2015)
 Lisa Marie Varon, American professional wrestler
 February 11 
 Damian Lewis, English actor and producer
 Susi Susanti, Indonesian badminton player
 February 13 – Mats Sundin, Swedish ice hockey player
 February 14
 Kris Aquino, Filipina actress
 Tommy Dreamer, American professional wrestler
 Viscera, American professional wrestler (d. 2014)
 Noriko Sakai, Japanese singer and actress
 February 15
 Alex Borstein, American actress, voice artist, producer and screenwriter
 Renee O'Connor, American actress
 February 16
 Jack Rose, American guitarist (d. 2009)
 Amanda Holden, British actress
 February 17 – Denise Richards, American actress
 February 18 – Thomas Bjørn, Danish golfer
 Hiep Thi Le, Vietnamese-American actress and restaurateur (d. 2017)
 February 19
 Gil Shaham, Israeli/American violinist
 Jeff Kinney, American author
 February 20
 Calpernia Addams, American actress
 Jari Litmanen, Finnish footballer
 Joost van der Westhuizen, South African rugby football player (d. 2017)
 February 22 
 Lisa Fernandez, American softball player
 Lea Salonga, Filipino singer and actress
 February 24
 Pedro de la Rosa, Spanish Formula One driver
 Gillian Flynn, American author, comic book writer, and screenwriter
 February 25
 Sean Astin, American actor, voice actor, director, and producer
 Nova Peris, Australian athlete and politician
 Daniel Powter, Canadian rock musician
 February 26
 Erykah Badu, American singer-songwriter and record producer
 Max Martin, Swedish music producer and songwriter
 February 27 
 David Rikl, Czech tennis player
 Rozonda Thomas, African-American singer

March

 March 1 
 Allen Johnson, American Olympic athlete
 Ma Dong-seok, Korean American actor 
 March 2
 Method Man, American rapper, record producer, and actor
 Karel Rada, Czech footballer
 March 4 – Jovan Stanković, Serbian footballer
 March 5 – Yuri Lowenthal, American actor, producer and screenwriter 
 March 6 – Val Venis, Canadian professional wrestler
 March 7
 Tal Banin, Israeli footballer and manager
 Peter Sarsgaard, American actor
 March 9 – Diego Torres, Argentine singer
 March 10 – Jon Hamm, American actor, director and producer
 March 11 – Johnny Knoxville, American actor, comedian, and stunt performer
 March 16 – Alan Tudyk, American actor
 March 22 – Karen McDougal, American model and actress
 Iben Hjejle, Danish actress
 Keegan-Michael Key, American actor, writer, and comedian
 March 24 – Victoria Prentis, British politician
 March 26 – Rennae Stubbs, Australian tennis player
 March 27
 David Coulthard, Scottish racing driver
 Nathan Fillion, Canadian actor
 March 29 – Villem Lüüs, Estonian draughts player and World Draughts Federation master (d. 2020)
 March 31
 Pavel Bure, Russian ice hockey player
 Ewan McGregor, Scottish actor

April

 April 1 
 Jessica Collins, American actress
 Daniel Vacek, Czech tennis player
 April 2
 Francisco Arce, Paraguayan footballer
 Todd Woodbridge, Australian tennis player
 April 3 – Picabo Street, American skier
 April 7 – Guillaume Depardieu, French actor (d. 2008)
 April 8 – Kim Byung-ji, South Korean goalkeeper
 April 9 – Jacques Villeneuve, Canadian 1997 Formula 1 world champion
 April 10 – Nana Smith, American born-Japanese tennis player
 April 11 – Oliver Riedel, German musician (Rammstein)
 April 12 
 Shannen Doherty, American actress
 Eyal Golan, Israeli singer
 April 14 – Miguel Calero, Colombian footballer (d. 2012)
 April 16
 Moses Chan, Hong Kong actor
 Selena, American singer (d. 1995)
 Natasha Zvereva, Belarusian tennis player
 April 17 – José Francisco Cevallos, Ecuadorian footballer 
 April 18 – David Tennant, Scottish actor
 April 20 – Carla Geurts, Dutch swimmer
 April 23 – D.B. Weiss, American television producer and writer, and novelist
 April 24 – Alejandro Fernández, Mexican singer
 April 28
 Markus Beyer, German Olympic boxer (d. 2018) 
 Bridget Moynahan, American actress
 April 29
 Leonid Kudayev, former Russian professional football player
 Darby Stanchfield, American actress
 April 30 – John Boyne, Irish novelist

May

 May 1 – Ajith Kumar, Indian film actor
 May 6 – Yolanda Díaz, Spanish politician and lawyer
 May 7 – Serhii Gordiienko, Ukrainian boxing trainer
 May 10 – Kim Jong-nam, eldest son of North Korean leader Kim Jong-il (d. 2017)
 May 14 – Sofia Coppola, American filmmaker
 May 17 – Queen Máxima of the Netherlands
 May 18 – Brad Friedel, American soccer player
 May 20 – Tony Stewart, American stock car racing driver and team owner
 May 21 – Aditya Chopra, Indian film director, producer and distributor 
 May 23 – George Osborne, British politician
 May 25 – Kristina Orbakaitė, Lithuanian-Russian singer and actress
 May 26 – Matt Stone, American actor, animator, writer, producer, and composer
 May 27
 Paul Bettany, British actor
 Lisa Lopes, African-American rapper (TLC) (d. 2002)
 May 28 
 Ekaterina Gordeeva, Russian Ice dancer
 Marco Rubio, American politician
 May 30  
 Idina Menzel, American singer, songwriter and actress
 John Ross Bowie, American actor and comedian

June

 June 1 – Mario Cimarro, Cuban actor and singer
 June 3 – Luigi Di Biagio, Italian footballer
 June 4
 Joseph Kabila, 4th President of the Democratic Republic of the Congo
 Noah Wyle, American actor
 June 5
 Susan Lynch, Northern Irish actress
 Mark Wahlberg, American actor, producer, businessman, model and rapper
 June 8 – Jeff Douglas, Canadian actor
 June 10
 Bobby Jindal, American politician
 Soraya Sáenz de Santamaría, Deputy Prime Minister of Spain
 June 12 – Mark Henry, American professional wrestler, Olympian
 June 16 – Tupac Shakur, African-American rapper and actor (d. 1996)
 June 17 – Paulina Rubio, Mexican singer
 June 18 – Jen Kiggans, American politician and nurse
 June 20 – Josh Lucas, American actor
 June 21 – Anette Olzon, Swedish singer (Nightwish, Alyson Avenue)
 June 22 – Kurt Warner, American football player
 June 24 
 Thomas Helveg, Danish footballer
 Ji Jin-hee, South Korean actor
 June 25
 Angela Kinsey, American actress
 Neil Lennon, Northern Irish footballer and manager
 June 26 – Max Biaggi, Italian motorcycle racer
 June 27 
 King Dipendra of Nepal (d. 2001)
 Serginho, Brazilian footballer
 June 28
 Fabien Barthez, French football player
 Kenny Cunningham, Irish football player
 Elon Musk, South African-born, American entrepreneur and investor
 Aileen Quinn, American actress
 June 29 – Nawal El Zoghbi, Lebanese singer
 June 30 – Monica Potter, American actress

July

 July 1
 Julianne Nicholson, American actress
 Amira Casar, French actress
 Missy Elliott, African-American rapper and singer-songwriter
 July 3 
 Julian Assange, Australian activist
 Benedict Wong, English actor
 July 7 – Christian Camargo, American actor, producer, writer and director
 July 8 
 Marc Andreessen, American software developer
 Marcel Blaguet Ledjou, Ivorian Chairman of the Africa Scout Committee
 Scott Grimes, American actor
 John Juanda, Indonesian-American professional poker player
 July 11
 Brett Hauer, American ice hockey player
 Park Hyuk-kwon, South Korean actor
 July 12 – Kristi Yamaguchi, American figure skater
 July 13 – MF Doom, British rapper (d. 2020)
 July 14
 Howard Webb, English football referee
 July 16 – Corey Feldman, American actor
 July 17
 Cory Doctorow, Canadian author and activist
 Benjamin Herrmann, German film producer and distributor 
 July 18 
 Penny Hardaway, American basketball player
 Sukhwinder Singh, Indian playback singer
 July 19 – Vitali Klitschko, Ukrainian boxer and politician
 July 20 – Sandra Oh, Korean actress
 July 21 – Charlotte Gainsbourg, French actress and singer-songwriter
 July 22 – Kristine Lilly, American soccer player
 July 23
 Ahmed Ezz, Egyptian actor
 Alison Krauss, American country singer
July 26 – Khaled Mahmud, Bangladeshi cricketer
 July 28 – Abu Bakr al-Baghdadi, Iraqi Islamic extremist leader (d. 2019)
 July 30 – Mzukisi Sikali, South African triple world champion boxer (d. 2005)

August

 August 1 – Juan Camilo Mouriño, Mexican politician (d. 2008)
 August 4 – Jeff Gordon, American race car driver
 August 5 – Valdis Dombrovskis, Latvian Prime Minister and European Commissioner
 August 6 – Yo-Yo, African-American rapper
 August 9 – James Kim, American television personality and technology analyst (d. 2006)
 August 10
 Fábio Assunção, Brazilian actor
 Roy Keane, Irish footballer and manager
 Mario César Kindelán Mesa, Cuban amateur boxer
 Justin Theroux, American actor
 August 12
 Yvette Nicole Brown, African-American actress and comedian
 Michael Ian Black, American actor and comedian
 Pete Sampras, American tennis player
 August 13
 Moritz Bleibtreu, German actor
 Heike Makatsch, German actress
 August 14 – Peter Franzén, Finnish actor
 August 17 – Jorge Posada, Puerto Rican baseball player
 August 18 – Aphex Twin, Irish-born British electronic musician
 August 19 – Mary Joe Fernández, American tennis player
 August 20 
 Ke Huy Quan, Vietnamese actor
 David Walliams, British actor, author and comedian
 August 21 – Robert Harvey, Australian rules footballer
 August 22
 Richard Armitage, English actor
 Benoît Violier, French born-Swiss chef (d. 2016)
 August 23 – Gretchen Whitmer, American politician and 49th Governor of Michigan
 August 25 – Ayumi Miyazaki, Japanese singer
 August 26 – Thalía, Mexican actress and singer
 August 27 – Julian Cheung, Hong Kong actor and singer
 August 28 – Janet Evans, American swimmer
 August 29 – Carla Gugino, American actress
 August 31
 Pádraig Harrington, Irish golfer
 Kinga Preis, Polish actress
 Chris Tucker, African-American actor and comedian
 Alicia Villarreal, Mexican singer and songwriter

September

 September 1
 Hakan Şükür, Turkish footballer
 Dave Wittenberg, South African-born American voice actor
 September 2 
 Kjetil André Aamodt, Norwegian alpine skier
 César Sánchez, Spanish footballer
 September 4 
 Mark Knowles, Bahamian tennis player
 Anita Yuen, Hong Kong actress
 September 5 – Kevin McAleenan, American government official, former United States Secretary of Homeland Security
 September 6 – Dolores O'Riordan, Irish singer (The Cranberries) (d. 2018)
 September 7 
 Shane Mosley, African-American professional boxer
 Briana Scurry, American soccer player
 September 8
 David Arquette, American actor, professional wrestler, film director, producer, screenwriter and fashion designer
 Martin Freeman, English actor
 September 9 – Henry Thomas, American actor
 September 11 – Alessandra Rosaldo, Mexican actress, singer and dancer
 September 13 
 Goran Ivanišević, Croatian tennis player
 Stella McCartney, British fashion designer, daughter of Paul McCartney
 September 14 – André Matos, Brazilian singer (d. 2019)
 September 15 – Josh Charles, American actor
 September 16 – Amy Poehler, American actress
 September 17 
 Edílson, Brazilian footballer
 Adriana Sklenarikova, Slovak fashion model and actress
  Jens Voigt, German cyclist
 September 18
 Lance Armstrong, American cyclist
 Anna Netrebko, Russian operatic soprano
 Jada Pinkett Smith, African-American actress, singer, and songwriter
 September 19 – Sanaa Lathan, African-American actress
 September 20 – Henrik Larsson, Swedish footballer and manager
 September 21
 Alfonso Ribeiro, American actor, television director, dancer, and host of America's Funniest Home Videos
 Luke Wilson, American actor
 September 23 – Lee Mi-yeon, South Korean actress
 September 24 – Michael S. Engel, American paleontologist and entomologist
 September 27 – Horacio Sandoval, Mexican artist
 September 29 – Sibel Tüzün, Turkish pop/rock/jazz singer
 September 30
 Jenna Elfman, American actress
 Jeff Whitty, American playwright

October

 October 1 – Gigi Lai, Hong Kong actress and singer
 October 2
 Xavier Naidoo, German singer
 Tiffany Darwish, American singer
 Jim Root, American guitarist (Slipknot, ex-Stone Sour)
 October 3 – Kevin Richardson, American pop singer
 October 4 – Ridwan Kamil, Indonesian architect, politician and current governor of West Java
 October 6 – Emily Mortimer, English actress and screenwriter
 October 7
 Yelena Shevchenko, Soviet gymnast
 Melinda Schneider, Australian singer and songwriter
 October 8 – Mayrín Villanueva, Mexican actress and model 
 October 10 – Evgeny Kissin, Russian pianist
 October 11 – Aman Verma, Indian television anchor and actor
 October 12 – Đàm Vĩnh Hưng, Vietnamese singer
 October 13
 Sacha Baron Cohen, English comedian and actor
 Pyrros Dimas, Greek weightlifter
 October 14 – Jorge Costa, Portuguese footballer
 October 15 – Niko Kovač, German-Croatian football player and coach
 October 17 – Andy Whitfield, Welsh actor and model (d. 2011)
 October 18 – Yoo Sang-chul, South Korean footballer and manager (d. 2021)
 October 20
 Snoop Dogg, African-American rapper, singer, songwriter, producer, media personality, entrepreneur, and actor
 Dannii Minogue, Australian singer
 October 21 – Ted Budd, American politician
 October 22 
 Amanda Coetzer, South African tennis player
 Jennifer Lee, American screenwriter, director, Chief Creative Officer of Walt Disney Animation Studios
 October 23 – Bohuslav Sobotka, 11th Prime Minister of the Czech Republic
 October 24
 Caprice Bourret, American model and actress
 Gustavo Jorge, Argentina rugby union player
 Diane Guthrie-Gresham, Jamaican track and field athletes
 October 25
 Athena Chu, Hong Kong actress and singer
 Midori Gotō, Japanese violinist
 Pedro Martínez, Dominican baseball player
 Craig Robinson, African-American actor, comedian and singer
 October 26 – Anthony Rapp, American actor and singer 
 October 29
 Chiara Badano, Italian Roman Catholic religious teenager and blessed (d. 1990)
 Matthew Hayden, Australian cricketer
 Ma Huateng, Chinese business magnate, founder of TenCent 
 Winona Ryder, American actress

November

 November 3 – Unai Emery, Spanish football coach
 November 4 – Tabu, Indian actress
 November 5 – Jonny Greenwood, English musician and composer
 November 6 – Laura Flessel-Colovic, French fencer and politician
 November 7 – Rituparna Sengupta, Indian actress
 November 8 – Tech N9ne, American rapper
 November 10
 Big Pun, American/Latin rapper (d. 2000)
 Fahri Hamzah, Indonesian politician
 Niki Karimi, Iranian actress and movie director
 Mario Abdo Benítez, President of Paraguay
 November 12
 Yasuo Aiuchi, Japanese snowboarder
 Chen Guangcheng, Chinese civil rights activist
 November 14 – Adam Gilchrist, Australian cricketer
November 15 – Delsa Solórzano, Venezuelan lawyer and politician
 November 16 
 Justine Clarke, Australian actress 
 Alexander Popov, Russian swimmer
November 18 – Özlem Tekin, Turkish singer
 November 20
 Dion Nash, New Zealand cricket captain
 Joel McHale, Italian-born American comedian, actor, writer, producer, and television host
 November 22 – Cecilia Suárez, Mexican actress and activist
 November 23 – Chris Hardwick, American actor, comedian, and television host
 November 25 – Christina Applegate, American actress
 November 27 – Albert Demchenko, Russian luger
 November 28 – Fenriz, Norwegian musician
 November 30 
 Jessalyn Gilsig, Canadian actress
 Kristi Noem, American politician

December

 December 2 – Francesco Toldo, Italian footballer
 December 3 – Frank Sinclair, Jamaican footballer
 December 5
Katherine Haringhton, Venezuelan lawyer
Kali Rocha, American actress
 December 6
 Richard Krajicek, Dutch tennis player
 Ryan White, American AIDS activist (d. 1990)
 Craig Brewer, American film director
 December 7
 Vladimir Akopian, Armenian chess player
 Larisa Alexandrovna, Ukrainian-American feminist
 December 11 – Erkan Petekkaya, Turkish actor
 December 12
 Sammy Korir, Kenyan long-distance runner
 Alireza Mansourian, Iranian footballer
 December 15 – Necati Şaşmaz, Turkish actor
 December 16
 Scott Booth, Scottish footballer
 Paul van Dyk, German dance music DJ, musician and record producer
 December 17 
 Antoine Rigaudeau, French basketball player
 Artur Petrosyan, Armenian footballer
 December 18 – Arantxa Sánchez Vicario, Spanish tennis player
 December 19 
 Amy Locane, American actress
 Figen Yüksekdağ, Turkish politician
 December 21 – Natalie Grant, American singer and songwriter 
 December 22 – Khalid Khannouchi, Moroccan long-distance runner
 December 23 – Corey Haim, Canadian actor (d. 2010)
 December 24
 Giorgos Alkaios, Greek recording artist
 Ricky Martin, Puerto Rican singer
 December 25
 Dido, English singer
 Justin Trudeau, 23rd Prime Minister of Canada
 December 26 – Jared Leto, American actor and musician (Thirty Seconds to Mars)
 December 27 – Sergei Bodrov Jr., Russian actor (d. 2002)
 December 31 – Brent Barry, American basketball player

Deaths

January

 January 5 – Douglas Shearer, Canadian film sound engineer (b. 1899)
 January 10 – Coco Chanel, French fashion designer (b. 1883)
 January 11 – Hussein Al Oweini, 18th Prime Minister of Lebanon (b. 1900)
 January 12 – John Tovey, 1st Baron Tovey, British admiral (b. 1885)
 January 14 – Guillermo de Torre, Spanish Dadaist author (b. 1900)
 January 15 – John Dall, American actor (b. 1920)
 January 17 – Lothar Rendulic, Austrian-born German general (b. 1887)
 January 20 – Broncho Billy Anderson, American actor, director, writer, and producer (b. 1880)
 January 24 – Bill W., co-founder Alcoholics Anonymous (b. 1895)
 January 25 – Hermann Hoth, German general (b. 1885)
 January 27 – Jacobo Árbenz, 19th President of Guatemala (b. 1913)
 January 28 – Donald Winnicott, British psychoanalyst (b. 1896)
 January 31 – Viktor Maksimovich Zhirmunsky, Russian literary historian, linguist (b. 1891)

February 

 February 1 – Raoul Hausmann, Austrian artist (b. 1886)
 February 3 – Jay C. Flippen, American actor (b. 1899)
 February 4 – Brock Chisholm, Canadian physician, 1st Director-General of World Health Organization (b. 1896)
 February 5 – Mátyás Rákosi, 43rd Prime Minister of Hungary (b. 1892)
 February 6 – Shigeru Fukudome, Japanese admiral (b. 1891)
 February 12 – James Cash Penney, American businessman, founder of J. C. Penney (b. 1875)
 February 17 – Adolf A. Berle, American lawyer, educator, author and diplomat (b. 1895)
 February 18 – Jaime de Barros Câmara, Brazilian archbishop (b. 1894)
 February 19 – Ibrahim Mohammad Jahfar, Bruneian politician (b. 1902)
 February 25 – Theodor Svedberg, Swedish chemist, Nobel Prize laureate (b. 1884)

March 

 March 3 – António Silva, Portuguese actor (b. 1886)
 March 7 – Stevie Smith (Florence Margaret Smith), English poet and novelist (b. 1902)
 March 8 – Harold Lloyd, American actor and filmmaker (b. 1893)
 March 9
 Anthony Berkeley Cox, English writer (b. 1893)
 Pope Cyril VI of Alexandria, Coptic Orthodox Patriarch (b. 1902)
 March 11
 Philo T. Farnsworth, American television pioneer (b. 1906)
 C. D. Broad, English philosopher (b. 1887)
 March 12 – David Burns, American actor (b. 1902)
 March 16
 Bebe Daniels, American actress (b. 1901)
 Thomas E. Dewey, Governor of New York; American presidential candidate (b. 1902)
 March 22 – Nella Walker, American actress and vaudevillian (b. 1886)
 March 23 – Basil Dearden, English film director (b. 1911)
 March 24 – Arne Jacobsen, Danish architect and designer (b. 1902)

April

 April 3 – Joseph Valachi, American gangster (b. 1904)
 April 6 – Igor Stravinsky, Russian composer (b. 1882)
 April 12 – Igor Tamm, Russian physicist, Nobel Prize laureate (b. 1895)
 April 15 – Friedebert Tuglas, Estonian writer and critic (b. 1886)
 April 19 – Earl Thomson, Canadian athlete (b. 1895)
 April 20 – Cecil Parker, English actor (b. 1897)
 April 21
 François Duvalier, 32nd President of Haiti (b. 1907)
 Edmund Lowe, American actor (b. 1890)
 April 25 – T. V. Soong, former Premier of the Republic of China (b. 1891)
 April 30 – Albin Stenroos, Finnish athlete (b. 1889)

May

 May 1 – Glenda Farrell, American actress (b. 1904)
 Mimi Mariani, Indonesian actress, model, and singer (b. 1928)
 May 6 – Helene Weigel, German actress (b. 1900)
 May 8 
 Godfrey Huggins, 1st Viscount Malvern, English-born Rhodesian politician and physician, Prime Minister of Rhodesia (b. 1883)
 Frederick Sheffield, American Olympic rower (b. 1902)
 May 11 – Seán Lemass, 4th Taoiseach of Ireland (b. 1899)
 May 12 – Tor Johnson, Swedish wrestler and actor (b. 1903)
 May 19 – Ogden Nash, American poet (b. 1902)
 May 27 – Chips Rafferty, Australian actor (b. 1909)
 May 28
 Kim Iryeop, Korean writer, journalist, feminist activist, Buddhist nun (b. 1896)
 Audie Murphy, American World War II hero and actor (b. 1925)
 Jean Vilar, French stage actor (b. 1912)
 May 30 – Marcel Dupré, French composer (b. 1886)

June

 June 1 – Reinhold Niebuhr, American theologian (b. 1892)
 June 4 – György Lukács, Hungarian Marxist philosopher, aesthetician, literary historian, and critic (b. 1885)
 June 10 – Michael Rennie, English actor (b. 1909)
 June 14 – Carlos P. Garcia, 8th President of the Philippines (b. 1896)
 June 15 – Wendell Meredith Stanley, American chemist, Nobel Prize laureate (b. 1904)
 June 18
 Thomas Gomez, American actor (b. 1905)
 Libby Holman, American singer and actress (b. 1904)
 Paul Karrer, Swiss chemist, Nobel Prize laureate (b. 1889)
 June 19 – Garfield Wood, American motorboat racer (b. 1880)
 June 25 – John Boyd Orr, 1st Baron Boyd-Orr, Scottish physician and biologist, recipient of the Nobel Peace Prize (b. 1880)
 June 29 
 Crew of Soyuz 11:
 Georgy Dobrovolsky (b. 1928)
 Viktor Patsayev (b. 1933)
 Vladislav Volkov (b. 1935)
 June 30 – Herbert Biberman, Jewish-American screenwriter and film director (b. 1900)

July

 July 1
 Sir Lawrence Bragg, English physicist, Nobel Prize laureate (b. 1890)
 Learie Constantine, Baron Constantine, Trinidadian cricketer (b. 1901)
 July 3 – Jim Morrison, American singer (The Doors) (b. 1943)
 July 4
 Maurice Bowra, British critic and academic (b. 1898)
 August Derleth, American author and anthologist (b. 1909)
 Thomas C. Hart, American admiral and politician (b. 1877)
 July 6 – Louis Armstrong, African-American jazz trumpeter (b. 1901)
 July 7 – Ub Iwerks, American animator (b. 1901)
 July 17 – Cliff Edwards, American actor (b. 1895)
 July 19 – John Jacob Astor, 1st Baron Astor of Hever, American-born British businessman (b. 1886)
 July 21 – Michael Somogyi, Hungarian-American biochemist (b. 1883)
 July 23
 Van Heflin, American actor (b. 1908)
 William Tubman, 19th president of Liberia (b. 1895)
 July 24 – Alan Rawsthorne, British Composer (b. 1905)
 July 26 – Diane Arbus, American photographer (b. 1923)

August

 August 5 – Royal Rife, American inventor (b. 1888)
 August 11 – Sir John Burton Cleland, Australian naturalist, microbiologist, mycologist and ornithologist (b. 1878)
 August 13 – King Curtis, American saxophonist (b. 1934)
 August 15 – Paul Lukas, Hungarian-born American actor (b. 1894)
 August 17 – Wilhelm List, German field marshal (b. 1880)
 August 21 – George Jackson, American author (b. 1941)
 August 24 – Carl Blegen, American archaeologist (b. 1887)
 August 25 – Ted Lewis, American musician and entertainer (b. 1890)
 August 27 – Margaret Bourke-White, American photographer (b. 1904)
 August 28 – Geoffrey Lawrence, 1st Baron Oaksey, British judge during the Nuremberg trials after World War II (b. 1880)

September

 September 7 – Spring Byington, American actress (b. 1886)
 September 8 – Emmett Toppino, American Olympic athlete (b. 1909)
 September 10 – Pier Angeli, Italian actress (b. 1932)
 September 11
 Bella Darvi, Polish-born actress (b. 1928)
 Joe Jordan, American ragtime composer (b. 1882)
 Nikita Khrushchev, Soviet leader (b. 1894)
 September 12 – Lin Biao, Chinese defense minister (b. 1907)
 September 14 – Tarasankar Bandyopadhyay, Bangladeshi novelist (b. 1898)
 September 20 – Giorgos Seferis, Greek writer, Nobel Prize laureate (b. 1900)
 September 21 – Bernardo Houssay, Argentine physiologist, Nobel Prize laureate (b. 1887)
 September 23
 James Waddell Alexander II, American mathematician and topologist (b. 1888)
 Billy Gilbert, American actor (b. 1894)
 September 25 – Hugo Black, American Supreme Court Justice (b. 1886)

October

 October 2
 Jessie Arms Botke, American artist (b. 1883)
 Richard H. Jackson, American four-star admiral (b. 1866)
 October 3 – Leah Baird, American actress (b. 1883)
 October 9 – Willam "Billy" Costello, American voice actor, the original voice of Popeye (b. 1898)
 October 10 – Sir Cyril Burt, British educational psychologist (b. 1883)
 October 11 – Chester Conklin, American actor (b. 1886)
 October 12
 Dean Acheson, 51st United States Secretary of State (b. 1893)
 Gene Vincent, American singer (b. 1935)
 October 17 – Sergey Kavtaradze, Soviet politician and diplomat (b. 1885)
 October 19 – Betty Bronson, American actress (b. 1906)
 October 21
 Raymond Hatton, American actor (b. 1887)
 Naoya Shiga, Japanese writer (b. 1883)
 October 24 – Carl Ruggles, American composer (b. 1876)
 October 29
 Duane Allman, American rock guitarist, co-founder and leader of the Allman Brothers Band (b. 1946)
 Arne Tiselius, Swedish chemist, Nobel Prize laureate (b. 1902)

November

 November 1 – Gertrud von Le Fort, German writer of novels, poems and essays (b. 1876)
 November 2 – Martha Vickers, American actress (b. 1925)
 November 4 – Guillermo León Valencia, 21st President of Colombia (b. 1909)
 November 9 – Maude Fealy, American stage and film actor (b. 1883)
 November 10 – Walter Van Tilburg Clark, American novelist (b. 1909)
 November 11 – A. P. Herbert, English humorist, novelist and politician (b. 1890)
 November 14 – Hanna Neumann, German mathematician (b. 1914)
 November 16 – Edie Sedgwick, American actress and model (b. 1943)
 November 17 – Dame Gladys Cooper, British actress (b. 1888)
 November 22 – József Zakariás, Hungarian footballer and manager (b. 1924)
 November 23 – Ryūnosuke Kusaka, Japanese admiral (b. 1893)
 November 25 – Hank Mann, American comedic actor (b. 1888)
 November 26 – James Alberione, Italian Roman Catholic priest and blessed (b. 1884)
 November 28 
 Wasfi Tal, three-time prime minister of Jordan (b. 1919)
 Grantley Herbert Adams, 1st Premier of Barbados (b. 1898)

December

 December 2 – Sir Derwent Hall Caine, English actor (b. 1891)
 December 6 – Mathilde Kschessinska, Russian ballerina (b. 1872)
 December 7 – Ferdinand Pecora, Sicilian-born American lawyer (d. 1882)
 December 9 
 Ralph Bunche, African-American diplomat, recipient of the Nobel Peace Prize (b. 1904)
 Aeneas Francon Williams, English missionary, Church of Scotland minister, writer and poet (d. 1971)
 December 10 – Gotthard Heinrici, German general (b. 1886)
 December 12
 Alan Morton, Scottish footballer (b. 1893)
 David Sarnoff, American radio and television pioneer (b. 1891)
 December 15 – Paul Levy, French mathematician (b. 1886)
 December 18
 Bobby Jones, American golfer (b. 1902)
 Diana Lynn, American actress (b. 1926)
 December 20 – Roy O. Disney, American studio executive (b. 1893)
 December 22 – Godfried Bomans, Dutch writer (b. 1913)
 December 24 – Maria Koepcke, German ornithologist (b. 1924)
 December 26 – Robert Lowery, American actor (b. 1913)
 December 28 – Max Steiner, Austrian-born film composer (b. 1888)
 December 30
 Jo Cals, Dutch politician and jurist, Prime Minister of the Netherlands (1965-1966) (b. 1914)
 Dorothy Comingore, American actress (b. 1913)
 December 31 – Pete Duel, American actor (b. 1940)

Nobel Prizes

 Physics – Dennis Gabor
 Chemistry – Gerhard Herzberg
 Medicine – Earl W. Sutherland, Jr
 Literature – Pablo Neruda
 Peace – Willy Brandt
 Economics – Simon Kuznets

References 

1971